Presidential elections were held in Poland on 10 and 24 May 2015. In the first round of voting Law and Justice (PiS) candidate, lawyer and Member of the European Parliament, Andrzej Duda received the greatest number of votes with a share of 34.76%, followed by incumbent president Bronisław Komorowski (with 33.77%), who ran as an independent with the endorsement of the Civic Platform (PO), which he had renounced his membership in after winning the 2010 elections. Independent candidate Paweł Kukiz came third with 20.80% of the votes. As no candidate had received more than 50% of the votes cast, a second round was held on 24 May between the two highest-placed candidates, Duda and Komorowski. This round was won by Duda with 51.5% of the votes, to Komorowski's 48.5%.

Electoral system
The president was elected directly by the people to serve for five years, and can be re-elected only once. Pursuant to the provisions of the Constitution, the president had to be elected by an absolute majority of valid votes; if no candidate succeeds in passing this threshold, a second round of voting is held with the two candidates who received the largest and second largest number of votes respectively.

In order to be registered to contest the elections, candidates had to be a Polish citizen, at least 35 years old on the day of the first round of the election, and have collected at least 100,000 voters' signatures.

According to the article 28, the day of the election had to fall on a Sunday between 100 and 75 days before the end of the term of the incumbent. As the term of Bronisław Komorowski would officially end on 6 August 2015, the first round had to occur between 27 April and 22 May, so that the possible dates were theoretically either 3, 10, or 17 May, though in practice only the latter two were realistic possibilities as the first fell on Constitution Day, a national holiday.

This was the first presidential election carried out following changes in 2011.

Candidates
In total 23 candidates registered with the State Electoral Commission. Only 11 submitted the required 100,000 signatures supporting their candidacy before the 26 March deadline.:

Rejected candidates
The registered candidates who failed to submit 100,000 signatures supporting their run for office were:
 Artur Głowacki, an entrepreneur
 Anna Grodzka, the first transgender member of the Polish parliament, The Greens party candidate
 Zdzisław Jankowski, deputy leader of Patriotic Poland party, former member of Sejm
 Dariusz Łaska, a candidate representing a minor NGO Patriotic Community of Solidary Deliberation.
Stanisław Majdański, former senator, candidate of agrarian conservative Ojcowizna party.
Balli Marzec, ethnic Kazakh activist and publicist, candidate of NGO Kazakh Community.
 Kornel Morawiecki, democratic activist in time of PRL, founder and leader of Fighting Solidarity, candidate in 2010 election.
Zenon Nowak, candidate of party Brave Dad protecting rights of fathers.
 Wanda Nowicka, current Deputy Marshall of the Sejm, the candidate of the social-democratic party Labour United.
 Iwona Piątek, leader of Women's Party
 Adam Słomka, a former member of Sejm and an anti-communist activist

Among those who publicly announced their candidacy, but failed to register, were:
 Waldemar Deska, a musician, former member of reggae band Daab, the candidate of the Libertarian Party, eventually withdrew his candidacy and expressed his support for Janusz Korwin-Mikke.
Włodzimierz Zydorczak, businessman and candidate of association Obywatelska RP. had his application rejected by the State Electoral Commission

Campaign

Television debates
One debate took place before the first round, on 5 May, chaired by Krzysztof Ziemiec and aired on TVP 1. Ten candidates attended the debate, while President Komorowski declined to appear.

Two debates took place before the second round, the first chaired by Dorota Gawryluk and by Krzysztof Ziemiec on 17 May, and the second on 21 May by TVN, chaired by Monika Olejnik, Bogdan Rymanowski and Justyna Pochanke. In both of these, the candidates also had the opportunity to pose questions to the other. Komorowski was generally regarded by the Polish press and political analysts to have won the first of the second-round debates. The second debate was considered to be less decisive.

Opinion polls
Nearly all opinion polls taken before the first round of the election predicted President Komorowski would receive the largest vote share in the first round, with some polls taken in late 2014 and early 2015 suggesting he was on track for an outright win that would avoid a runoff election.

Polls were closer in the second round, with most predicting a narrow Duda victory. At least one late poll showed Komorowski pulling ahead, but just slightly.

First round

 Notes
  PSL's candidate's name had not been announced at the time, however the poll asked about support for any potential party's candidate.
  Including Ryszard Kalisz at 4%
  Including Wojciech Olejniczak at 6.4%, Jarosław Kalinowski at 1.7%, Zbigniew Stonoga at 1%, and Mirosław Piotrowski at 0.4%
  Including Ryszard Kalisz at 10%
  Including Ryszard Kalisz at 3%

Second round

Results
Duda took a narrow first-place finish over Komorowski in the first round of the election on 10 May 2015, forcing the incumbent into a runoff. The result was described as a surprise, as the Komorowski camp and many political observers expected him to perform better or perhaps win outright. Paweł Kukiz, who finished third in the first round of voting, declined to endorse either Duda or Komorowski, instead offering to moderate a debate between the two candidates. Komorowski declined to participate, and the debate was never held.

In the second round of the election on 24 May, Duda unseated Komorowski in what was until 2020 the closest presidential election since Poland became a democracy. He defeated the incumbent by a margin of approximately three percentage points, according to official results.

Reactions
Komorowski said after the release of the exit poll that it was important to respect the result of the vote. He conceded defeat that evening and wished Duda "a successful presidency".

Duda hailed his victory as a vote for change. His campaign manager said the election showed that the Law and Justice bloc could win parliamentary elections scheduled for autumn, something that the party achieved.

Many world leaders, including United States President Barack Obama, German Chancellor Angela Merkel, and Russian President Vladimir Putin, congratulated Duda on his victory.

See also
 2015 Polish parliamentary election
 History of Poland (1989–present)
 Polish Constitutional Court crisis, 2015

Notes

References

External links

Polish Election Committee 

Poland
 
President
Poland
Presidential elections in Poland